Okkanadu Keelaiyur is a village panchayat located in the Thanjavur district of Tamil-Nadu state, India. 
Chennai is the state capital for Okkanadu Keelaiyur village. 

It is located about 293 kilometers away from Okkanadu Keelaiyur. The second-nearest state capital from Okkanadu Keelaiyur is Pondicherry, with a distance of 155.3 km. The other surrounding state capitals are Bangalore, 323.9 km away, and Thiruvananthapuram.  

The Okkanadu Keelaiyu village is one of the biggest villages in Orathanadu and it is also called Okkur nadu. The villages sharing the border are Okkandu malaiyur, Keelavannipattu, Kavarapattu and Arumulai respectively. The Okkanadu keelaiyur village population consists of more than 7000 people and they are divided up by four streets and they have one youth social service team each: 1) East street have Vivekananthar Narpani Mandram., 2) West street have Bharathi Narpani Mandram, 3) North street have Mutthamizh Narpani Mandram and 4)South street have Nethaji Narpani Mandram. The primary occupation in the village is farming.

List of temples

1)  Selliyamman (Selvi Amman)

2)  Nadu Kaattu Sella Ayyanar

3)  Karai Male Azhagar

4)  Throupathi Amman

5)  Utthira Pathiyar

6)  Nalla koothu Ayyanar

7)  Ambalavaanan Samy

8)  Maariyamman 

These are all common temples in Okkanadu Keelaiyur village and they have a lot of individual temples also.

List of schools

1) Government Primary School

2) Government Primary School (Karuvizhikaadu)

3) Government Boys High School

4) Government Girls High School

5) Government Higher Secondary School

Villages in Thanjavur district